KidzDunya is a privately held Pakistani company. Currently operating in Karachi, Pakistan. They have only one branch in all of Pakistan, which is in Clifton, Karachi. They are based on the popular theme park called KidZania that holds multiple branches around the world.

Overview
KidzDunya is themed as a child-sized replica of a real city, including buildings, shops and restaurants, as well as vehicles moving along its streets. In this city, children aged 4 through 14, work in branded activities and run the world.

Location(s)
 KidzDunya Karachi, opened in December 2013.

References

External links

Categories

Tourist attractions in Karachi
Entertainment in Karachi